Arie Manuel Kouandjio (born April 23, 1992) is a former Cameroonian professional American football guard. He played college football at Alabama, and was drafted by the Washington Redskins in the fourth round of the 2015 NFL Draft.

Early life
Georgette and Jean-Claude Kouandjio, Arie's mother and father, immigrated to the United States from Cameroon in 1998 when he was six years old.

Kouandjio initially attended High Point High School in Beltsville, Maryland, where he played football for the Eagles program. After his sophomore year he was recruited and transferred to DeMatha Catholic High School in Hyattsville, Maryland along with his younger brother Cyrus, where he played football for the Stags program. He was a four-star recruit by Rivals.com. In February 2010, he committed to the University of Alabama to play college football.

College career
Kouandjio was redshirted as a true freshman in 2010. As a redshirt freshman in 2011, he played in two games before a knee injury ended his season. As a sophomore in 2012, Kouandjio played in 11 of 14 games as a backup. He became a starter for the first time as junior in 2013, starting all 13 games. Kouandjio returned as a starter his senior year in 2014. He started all 14 games and was named a second-team All-American.

Professional career

Washington Redskins
The Washington Redskins drafted Kouandjio in the fourth round with the 112th overall pick in the 2015 NFL Draft. He signed a four-year contract on May 11, 2015.

On September 2, 2017, Kouandjio was waived by the Redskins.

Baltimore Ravens
On September 19, 2017, Kouandjio was signed to the Baltimore Ravens' practice squad.

Washington Redskins (second stint)
On October 28, 2017, Kouandjio was signed by the Redskins off the Ravens' practice squad. He played in eight games in 2017, starting six at right guard.

On May 15, 2018, it was announced that Kouandjio would undergo quad surgery for a partial tear. The next week, following the surgery, it was reported that Kouandjio would miss the entire 2018 season.

New York Guardians
Kouandjio was drafted in the 10th round in phase two in the 2020 XFL Draft by the New York Guardians.

Personal life
Kouandjio's younger brother, Cyrus, who played at Alabama as an offensive tackle and was selected in second round of the 2014 NFL Draft by the Buffalo Bills. Kouandjio became a US citizen on September 13, 2016.

References

External links
Alabama Crimson Tide bio
Washington Redskins bio

1992 births
Living people
Alabama Crimson Tide football players
American football offensive guards
American people of Cameroonian descent
Baltimore Ravens players
New York Guardians players
Players of American football from Maryland
Sportspeople from the Washington metropolitan area
Washington Redskins players
DeMatha Catholic High School alumni